Jeremy Adam McKinney (born January 6, 1976) is a former American football offensive guard in the National Football League for the St. Louis Rams, Detroit Lions, Cleveland Browns, Houston Texans and Dallas Cowboys. He played college football at the University of Iowa.

Early years
McKinney attended Horizon High School, where he played offensive and defensive tackle. As a senior, he received SuperPrep All-American, All-state and Rocky Mountain News Defensive Player of the Year honors. In his career, he registered over 100 tackles, nearly 50 tackles for loss, 7 forced fumbles and more than 25 sacks. He also practiced basketball and baseball.

He accepted a football scholarship from the University of Iowa, where as a freshman played on the offensive line for the first 4 games, before moving to defensive tackle for the last 7 games (2 starts) and recording 22 tackles (2 for loss), one sack and a pass defensed. The next year, he was moved back to offense, starting five games at left tackle and being used on both sides of the line.

As a junior, he became a regular starter at right tackle. As a senior, he contributed to the team leading the Big Ten Conference in rushing offense (ranked eighth in the nation) and scoring offense.

Professional career

St. Louis Rams (first stint)
McKinney was signed as an undrafted free agent by the St. Louis Rams after the 1998 NFL Draft on April 20. He was waived on August 30 and signed to the practice squad. On December 19, he was promoted to the active roster and declared inactive for the last 2 games of the season.

On September 5, 1999, the Rams were going to cut McKinney with an injured wrist, but because they were late reporting it to the NFL office, they were forced by the league to waive a different player. He was released on September 7.

Detroit Lions
On October 12, 1999, he was signed to the Detroit Lions' practice squad. He was released on November 9.

St. Louis Rams (second stint)
On November 24, 1999, he was signed to the St. Louis Rams' practice squad.

Cleveland Browns
On December 16, 1999, he was signed by the Cleveland Browns from the Rams practice squad. In 2000, he suffered a right knee injury in the second preseason game against the Chicago Bears and was placed on the injured reserve list on August 16. He returned in 2001 and was named the starter at right guard on October 21, in place of an injured Tre Johnson.

Houston Texans
McKinney was selected in the eleventh round of the 2002 expansion draft by the Houston Texans. After being waived on September 1, he was re-signed 5 days later because of injuries on the offensive line. He was cut on September 10.

Dallas Cowboys
On October 18, 2002, he was signed by the Dallas Cowboys as a free agent. He also became part of history as the starting left guard on the Cowboys offensive line that helped Emmitt Smith eclipse Walter Payton as the NFL's all-time leading rusher, playing against the Seattle Seahawks on October 27.

On November 5, he underwent angioplasty surgery because the narrowing of an artery, after suffering shortness of breath while flying back home from the Detroit Lions game. On November 13, he was placed on the non-football injury list and was lost for the season. He was released on February 20, 2003, because of his health condition.

References

External links
Just Sports Stats

Living people
1976 births
People from Thornton, Colorado
Players of American football from Colorado
American football offensive guards
Iowa Hawkeyes football players
St. Louis Rams players
Detroit Lions players
Cleveland Browns players
Houston Texans players
Dallas Cowboys players
Ed Block Courage Award recipients